WZQY (100.5 FM) is a radio station licensed to Glade Spring, Virginia, which is owned by Ladybug Radio, LLC.

References

External links

2008 establishments in Virginia
Mainstream adult contemporary radio stations in the United States
Radio stations established in 2008
ZQY